Robin Szarka is a German footballer who plays as a left back for 1899 Hoffenheim II.

References

External links
 
 Robin Szarka at Kicker

1991 births
Living people
German footballers
Association football defenders
TSG 1899 Hoffenheim II players
TSG 1899 Hoffenheim players
FC Energie Cottbus players
3. Liga players
Regionalliga players
Footballers from Mannheim